The 2002 New York City Marathon was the 33rd running of the annual marathon race in New York City, United States, which took place on Sunday, November 4. The men's elite race was won by Kenya's Rodgers Rop in a time of 2:08:07 hours while the women's race was won in 2:25:56 by Joyce Chepchumba, also of Kenya.

This was the first time in Marathon history that three men from Kenya placed first, second, and third in a marathon. This also was the first time a man and woman from Kenya won the men's and women's race in a marathon as well. 

In the wheelchair races, Americans Krige Schabort (1:38:27) and Cheri Blauwet (2:14:39) won the men's and women's divisions, respectively. In the handcycle race, Switzerland's Franz Nietlispach (1:26:57) and America's Helene Hines (1:59:26) were the winners.

A total of 31,824 runners finished the race, 21,634 men and 10,190 women.

Results

Men

Women

 Olivera Jevtić of Serbia originally finished in third place in a time of 2:26:44 hours but was later disqualified after testing positive for ephedrine, a banned stimulant.

Wheelchair men

Wheelchair women

Handcycle men

Handcycle women

References

Results
2002 New York Marathon Results. New York Road Runners. Retrieved 2020-05-19.
Results. Association of Road Racing Statisticians. Retrieved 2020-05-19.

External links
New York Road Runners website

2002
New York City
Marathon
New York City Marathon